Les Islettes is a commune in the Meuse department of Grand Est in north-eastern France.

See also
Communes of the Meuse department

References

Islettes